Southern Columbia Area High School is a small, rural public high school located in Catawissa, Pennsylvania. It is the sole high school operated by Southern Columbia Area School District. In 2013, Southern Columbia Area High School reported an enrollment of 437 pupils in grades 9th through 12th. The school employed 33 teachers.
Southern Columbia Area High School students may choose to attend Columbia-Montour Area Vocational-Technical School for training. The Central Susquehanna Intermediate Unit IU16 provides the school with a wide variety of services like specialized education for disabled students and hearing, speech and visual disability services and professional development for staff and faculty.

Extracurricular activities
The Southern Columbia Area School District offers a variety of clubs, activities and an extensive sports program. The sports programs are through the Pennsylvania Heartland Athletic Conference and the Pennsylvania Interscholastic Athletic Association. The Pennsylvania Heartland Athletic Conference is a voluntary association of 25 PIAA High Schools within the central Pennsylvania region. Southern Columbia currently holds the Pennsylvania state record for consecutive and total state football championships, with 6 and 13 respectively.

Sports
The district funds:

Boys
Baseball - AA
Basketball- AA
Bowling - AAAA
Cross country - A
Football - AA
Golf - AA
 Soccer - A
Track and field
Wrestling - AA

Girls
Basketball - AA
Bowling - AAAA
Cross country - A
Field hockey - AA
Golf
Soccer - A
Softball - AA
Track and field - AA

Junior high school sports

Boys
Basketball
Cross country
Football
Wrestling 

Girls
Basketball
Cross country
Field hockey
Soccer 

According to PIAA directory July 2012

References

External links
 Southern Columbia Area School District
 Columbia-Montour Area Vocational-Technical School

Public high schools in Pennsylvania
Schools in Columbia County, Pennsylvania
Education in Northumberland County, Pennsylvania